La Lima Airport  is a general aviation airport serving the town of La Lima in Cortés Department, Honduras.

See also

Transport in Honduras
List of airports in Honduras

References

External links
OpenStreetMap - La Lima Airport
HERE Maps - La Lima
OurAirports - Reginaldo Hammer Airport

Airports in Honduras